Mala Kriegel, (born Mala Ehrlischster, 15 September 1912 – 27 August 1944) was a French dental surgeon, and communist, and member of the Francs-tireurs et partisans.

Life 
Born in Poland, she arrived in France in the 1930s to study medicine in Strasbourg, where she fought with the Communists. In September 1937, she met the anti-fascist activist Maurice Kriegel-Valrimont, whom she would marry.

The couple moved to Paris the same year, in the 15th arrondissement, where Mala Kriegel began to practice as a dental surgeon.

She became involved in the French communist interior Resistance as a distributor of the newspaper La Marseillaise, organ of the National Front in Marseille. In 1944, during a distribution in the northern districts of the city, she fell, with the militants Victor Fantini, Merotte and Dufour, into an ambush. They were ejected from the car, disarmed and pressed against a wall, then machine-gunned by the German army, which left them for dead. Victor Fantini reports, in his memoirs, the last words of Mala Kriegel: “It is terrible what is happening to us, but despite everything I would have had the joy of seeing our newspapers in broad daylight."

On 27 August 1944, she died  in hospital as a result of her injuries and was buried in a common grave in the Saint-Pierre Cemetery in Marseille. A procession was formed by his resistance companions during the funeral. The photos of the resistance fighter and Marseille photographer Julia Pirotte document the ceremony.

References 

1912 births
1944 deaths
French activists
French women activists
French communists
Communist members of the French Resistance
20th-century French women
People executed by Nazi Germany by firing squad